Friedrich Traugott Wahlen (10 April 1899, in Mirchel, Canton of Bern – 7 November 1985, in Bern) was a Swiss agronomist and politician.

During the Second World War, he was responsible of the Swiss programme to reduce food imports and increase agricultural production, which consisted mainly in extending the cultivation area, and reducing meat production in favour of cereals production. The programme was called after his name, as Wahlen Plan.

He then served as Deputy Director-General of the Food and Agriculture Organization for the UN from July 1958 to January 1959. 

He was elected to the Swiss Federal Council on 11 December 1958 and handed over office on 31 December 1965. He was affiliated to the Party of Farmers, Traders and Independents (BGB/PAI), now the Swiss People's Party. 

During his time in office he held the following departments:
 Department of Justice and Police (1959)
 Department of Economic Affairs (1960)
 Political Department (1961)
 Department of Economic Affairs (1961)
 Political Department (1962–1965)

He was President of the Confederation in 1961.

Honours 
  Empire of Iran : Commemorative Medal of the 2500th Anniversary of the founding of the Persian Empire (14/10/1971).

References

External links

 
 
 

1899 births
1985 deaths
People from Bern-Mittelland District
Swiss Calvinist and Reformed Christians
Party of Farmers, Traders and Independents politicians
Swiss People's Party politicians
Members of the Federal Council (Switzerland)
Members of the Council of States (Switzerland)
ETH Zurich alumni
Foreign ministers of Switzerland
Albert Einstein Medal recipients
Academic staff of ETH Zurich